Drömfakulteten (lit. The Dream Faculty) is a 2006 novel by the Swedish writer Sara Stridsberg. The main character of the narrative is the American radical feminist Valerie Solanas. The novel received the Nordic Council Literature Prize. In 2011 it was voted as the best Swedish novel from the 2000s (decade) in a poll held by the newspaper Dagens Nyheter, which involved one hundred Swedish critics, authors, journalists and publishers.

The English translation, The Faculty of Dreams, by Deborah Bragan-Turner, was nominated in March 2019 for the British Man Booker International Prize.

See also
 2006 in literature
 Swedish literature

References

2006 Swedish novels
Albert Bonniers Förlag books
Cultural depictions of Valerie Solanas
Nordic Council's Literature Prize-winning works
Swedish-language novels